Margarete-Schrader-Preis is a German literary prize. It is awarded by University of Paderborn to authors who have lived or promoted literature in Westphalia. The prize is named after Margarete Schrader (1914–2001) who left money for the award in her will. It is the only literary prize in Germany to be awarded by a university. Award winners receive €8,000.

Previous winners
2016: Jörg Albrecht
2012: Martin Heckmanns
2009: Kevin Vennemann
2006: Judith Kuckart
2003: Hans-Ulrich Treichel

References

German literary awards
2003 establishments in Germany
Awards established in 2003